Mark Walton (born March 29, 1997) is a former American football running back. He played college football at Miami (FL), and he was drafted by the Cincinnati Bengals in the fourth round of the 2018 NFL Draft. He also played for the Miami Dolphins.

Early years
Walton attended Booker T. Washington High School in Miami, Florida. During his career, he rushed for 2,769 yards and 45 touchdowns for the Tornadoes. He committed to the University of Miami to play college football.

College career
Walton played in all 13 games as a true freshman at Miami in 2015, rushing for 450 yards on 129 carries with 9 touchdowns. As a sophomore in 2016, he started all 13 games and rushed for 1,117 yards on 209 carries with 14 touchdowns. In 2017, as a junior, he rushed for 428 yards and three touchdowns on 56 carries in only four games due to ankle surgery which forced him to miss a majority of the season. On December 5, 2017, Walton declared his intentions to enter the 2018 NFL Draft.

Collegiate statistics

Professional career

Cincinnati Bengals
Walton was drafted by the Cincinnati Bengals in the fourth round (112th overall) of the 2018 NFL Draft. In the Bengals' Week 4 victory over the Atlanta Falcons, he had his first five professional carries for nine rushing yards to go along with two receptions for 28 receiving yards. Overall, he finished his rookie season with 14 carries for 34 rushing yards to go along with five receptions for 41 receiving yards.

On April 6, 2019, Walton was waived by the Bengals after being arrested for the third time in the offseason.

Miami Dolphins
After a mini-camp tryout, Walton signed with the Miami Dolphins on May 12, 2019. Walton made his first start against the Washington Redskins, rushing six times for 32 yards in a 16–17 Dolphins loss. He rushed for 66 yards on 14 carries the following week against the Buffalo Bills, also catching one reception for -8 yards. On November 4, he was suspended four games by the NFL for violating the league's personal conduct and substance abuse policies for his offseason arrests. The Dolphins waived him on November 19, 2019, after his fourth arrest of the year. His suspension was lifted on December 3, 2019. Walton was suspended an additional eight weeks by the NFL on November 13, 2020, and reinstated on January 4, 2021.

Legal issues
Walton was arrested three times during the 2019 off-season. He was first arrested and charged with misdemeanor marijuana possession on January 16, 2019, in North Miami-Dade. On February 15, 2019, he was arrested for a second time and charged with misdemeanor battery for an altercation triggered after he grabbed a phone from a neighbor in Miami. The charges underlying his third arrest on April 4, 2019, stemmed from a March 12, 2019, incident in which Walton fled on foot from his rented car after police tried to pull him over. Authorities found a rifle in the car and accused Walton of carrying a concealed firearm, resisting an officer without violence, possession of marijuana, and reckless driving. Walton pleaded no contest to a misdemeanor weapons charge from the March 2019 incident on August 19, 2019, and he received six months of probation and was required to turn in all of his firearms as well as undergo anger management and driving courses. The two marijuana possession charges and the battery charge were also dismissed.

On November 19, 2019, Walton was arrested in Davie, Florida, for allegedly attacking a woman who was five months pregnant with his child. Walton was charged with aggravated battery of a pregnant woman. On January 3, 2020, he was charged with a second count of aggravated battery of a pregnant woman for a different incident with the same woman in March 2019. He was arrested on February 27, 2020, for violating a restraining order. On May 13, 2020, the aggravated battery charge against him from November 2019 was dropped.

On February 1, 2021, Walton was arrested in Miami for allegedly attempting to break a Pizza Hut window.

On March 24, 2022, Walton was arrested in Miami for an alleged armed robbery.

References

External links
Miami Hurricanes bio
Cincinnati Bengals bio

1997 births
Living people
Booker T. Washington Senior High School (Miami, Florida) alumni
Players of American football from Miami
American football running backs
Miami Hurricanes football players
Cincinnati Bengals players
Miami Dolphins players